Lotte Center Hanoi is a skyscraper in Ba Đình, Hanoi, Vietnam. Completed on 2 September 2014, the tower has 65 floors. The center features a modern architectural style designed by Callison, an American company. This tower is the third tallest building in Vietnam after Landmark 81 and the Keangnam Hanoi Landmark Tower in Cau Giay district. Lotte Center Hanoi includes offices, a 5 star hotel, a 6th floor Lotte Department Store, serviced residences, the Evian Spa, the Lotte Mart, restaurants and an observation deck.

Elevators
The center contains 30 elevators that travel at 360m/min or 6 m/s.

Observation deck
There is an observation deck on the 65th floor named Top of Hanoi. It has a small shop which sells drinks and snacks.

Trip to the rooftop
At 65th floor the Lotte Center Building, there is a separate lift that takes visitors up two more floors. The 67th floor is thus denoted "PH" because it is the top floor. After exiting the elevator, there is a short set of stairs that takes visitors up to the highest floor of the building, this level is the top of the building and thus has no roof. At the rooftop there is a bar and a mini restaurant.

Gallery

References

External links
 
 S.Korea’s Lotte eyes Vietnam’s highest skyscraper project

Skyscrapers in Hanoi
2010 in Vietnam
Lotte Corporation
Skyscraper office buildings in Vietnam